Østfold is one of the 19 multi-member constituencies of the Storting, the national legislature of Norway. The constituency was established in 1921 following the introduction of proportional representation for elections to the Storting. It consists of the municipalities of Aremark, Fredrikstad, Halden, Hvaler, Indre Østfold, Marker, Moss, Råde, Rakkestad, Sarpsborg, Skiptvet and Våler in the county of Viken. The constituency currently elects eight of the 169 members of the Storting using the open party-list proportional representation electoral system. At the 2021 parliamentary election it had 223,945 registered electors.

Electoral system
Østfold currently elects eight of the 169 members of the Storting using the open party-list proportional representation electoral system. Constituency seats are allocated by the County Electoral Committee using the Modified Sainte-Laguë method. Compensatory seats (seats at large) are calculated based on the national vote and are allocated by the National Electoral Committee using the Modified Sainte-Laguë method at the constituency level (one for each constituency). Only parties that reach the 4% national threshold compete for compensatory seats.

Election results

Summary

(Excludes compensatory seats. Figures in italics represent joint lists.)

Detailed

2020s

2021
Results of the 2021 parliamentary election held on 13 September 2021:

The following candidates were elected:
Elise Bjørnebekk-Waagen (Ap); Kjerstin Wøyen Funderud (Sp); Stein Erik Lauvås (Ap); Ole André Myhrvold (Sp); Jon-Ivar Nygård (Ap); Freddy André Øvstegård (SV); Tage Pettersen (H); Ingjerd Schou (H); and Erlend Wiborg (FrP).

2010s

2017
Results of the 2017 parliamentary election held on 11 September 2017:

The following candidates were elected:
Elise Bjørnebekk-Waagen (Ap); Svein Roald Hansen (Ap); Stein Erik Lauvås (Ap); Ulf Leirstein (FrP); Ole André Myhrvold (Sp); Freddy André Øvstegård (SV); Tage Pettersen (H); Ingjerd Schou (H); and Erlend Wiborg (FrP).

2013
Results of the 2013 parliamentary election held on 8 and 9 September 2013:

The following candidates were elected:
Svein Roald Hansen (Ap); Line Henriette Holten Hjemdal (KrF); Irene Johansen (Ap); Stein Erik Lauvås (Ap); Ulf Leirstein (FrP); Eirik Milde (H); Ingjerd Schou (H); Bengt Morten Wenstøb (H); and Erlend Wiborg (FrP).

2000s

2009
Results of the 2009 parliamentary election held on 13 and 14 September 2009:

The following candidates were elected:
Thor Erik Forsberg (Ap); Jon Jæger Gåsvatn (FrP); Vigdis Giltun (FrP); Svein Roald Hansen (Ap); Line Henriette Holten Hjemdal (KrF); Irene Johansen (Ap); Ulf Leirstein (FrP); Wenche Olsen (Ap); and Ingjerd Schou (H).

2005
Results of the 2005 parliamentary election held on 11 and 12 September 2005:

The following candidates were elected:
Martin Engeset (H); Jon Jæger Gåsvatn (FrP); Vigdis Giltun (FrP); May Hansen (SV); Svein Roald Hansen (Ap); Line Henriette Holten Hjemdal (KrF); Irene Johansen (Ap); Ulf Leirstein (FrP); and Signe Øye (Ap).

2001
Results of the 2001 parliamentary election held on 9 and 10 September 2001:

The following candidates were elected:
Martin Engeset (H); May Hansen (SV); Svein Roald Hansen (Ap); Øystein Hedstrøm (FrP); Odd Holten (KrF); Signe Øye (Ap); Henrik Rød (FrP); and Ingjerd Schou (H).

1990s

1997
Results of the 1997 parliamentary election held on 15 September 1997:

The following candidates were elected:
Øystein Hedstrøm (FrP); Odd Holten (KrF); Kjellaug Nakkim (H); Signe Øye (Ap); Gunnar Skaug (Ap); Jørn L. Stang (FrP); Tom Thoresen (Ap); and Ane Sofie Tømmerås (Ap).

1993
Results of the 1993 parliamentary election held on 12 and 13 September 1993:

The following candidates were elected:
Edvard Grimstad (Sp); Øystein Hedstrøm (FrP); Odd Holten (KrF); Kjellaug Nakkim (H); Signe Øye (Ap); Gunnar Skaug (Ap); Tom Thoresen (Ap); and Ane Sofie Tømmerås (Ap).

1980s

1989
Results of the 1989 parliamentary election held on 10 and 11 September 1989:

The following candidates were elected:
Edvard Grimstad (Sp); Øystein Hedstrøm (FrP); Sigurd Holemark (H); Odd Holten (KrF); Åsa Solberg Iversen (Ap); Wenche Lyngholm (SV); Kjellaug Nakkim (H); Gunnar Skaug (Ap); and Tom Thoresen (Ap).

1985
Results of the 1985 parliamentary election held on 8 and 9 September 1985:

As the list alliance was entitled to more seats contesting as an alliance than it was contesting as individual parties, the distribution of seats was as list alliance votes. The H-Sp list alliance's additional seat was allocated to the Conservative Party.

The following candidates were elected:
Reidun Andreassen (Ap); Georg Apenes (H); Bente Bakke (H); Sigurd Holemark (H); Odd Steinar Holøs (KrF); Åsa Solberg Iversen (Ap); Gunnar Skaug (Ap); and Tom Thoresen (Ap).

1981
Results of the 1981 parliamentary election held on 13 and 14 September 1981:

The following candidates were elected:
Georg Apenes (H); Ingvar Bakken (Ap); Sigurd Holemark (H); Odd Steinar Holøs (KrF); Gunnar Skaug (Ap); Svenn Stray (H); Liv Stubberud (Ap); and Tom Thoresen (Ap).

1970s

1977
Results of the 1977 parliamentary election held on 11 and 12 September 1977:

The following candidates were elected:
Georg Apenes (H); Ingvar Bakken (Ap); Arvid Johanson (Ap); Lars Korvald (KrF); Thorbjørn Kultorp (Ap); Svenn Stray (H); Liv Stubberud (Ap); and Tom Thoresen (Ap).

1973
Results of the 1973 parliamentary election held on 9 and 10 September 1973:

The following candidates were elected:
Ingvar Bakken (Ap); Otto Hauglin (SV); Arvid Johanson (Ap); Lars Korvald (KrF); Thorbjørn Kultorp (Ap); Anton Skulberg (Sp); Svenn Stray (H); and Liv Stubberud (Ap).

1960s

1969
Results of the 1969 parliamentary election held on 7 and 8 September 1969:

The following candidates were elected:
Ingvar Bakken (Ap); Martha Frederikke Johannessen (Ap); Arvid Johanson (Ap); Lars Korvald (KrF); Thorbjørn Kultorp (Ap); Gunnar Skaug (Ap); Anton Skulberg (Sp); and Svenn Stray (H).

1965
Results of the 1965 parliamentary election held on 12 and 13 September 1965:

The following candidates were elected:
Ingvar Bakken (Ap); Erik Braadland (Sp-V); Nils Hønsvald (Ap); Martha Frederikke Johannessen (Ap); Arvid Johanson (Ap); Lars Korvald (KrF); Per Sonerud (H); and Svenn Stray (H).

1961
Results of the 1961 parliamentary election held on 11 September 1961:

The following candidates were elected:
Ingvar Bakken (Ap), 62,840 votes; Erik Braadland (Sp-V), 12,499 votes; Erling Fredriksfryd (H), 21,644 votes; Nils Hønsvald (Ap), 62,840 votes; Henry Jacobsen (Ap), 62,836 votes; Martha Frederikke Johannessen (Ap), 62,837 votes; Lars Korvald (KrF), 12,629 votes; and Svenn Stray (H), 21,641 votes.

1950s

1957
Results of the 1957 parliamentary election held on 7 October 1957:

The following candidates were elected:
Ingvar Bakken (Ap); Erling Fredriksfryd (H); Nils Hønsvald (Ap); Henry Jacobsen (Ap); Martha Frederikke Johannessen (Ap); Arvid Johanson (Ap); Asbjørn Solberg (KrF); and Svenn Stray (H).

1953
Results of the 1953 parliamentary election held on 12 October 1953:

The following candidates were elected:
Arthur Arntzen (Ap); Wilhelm Engel Bredal (Bp); Erling Fredriksfryd (H); Nils Hønsvald (Ap); Henry Jacobsen (Ap); Karl Henry Karlsen (Ap); Klara Amalie Skoglund (Ap); and Asbjørn Solberg (KrF).

1940s

1949
Results of the 1949 parliamentary election held on 10 October 1949:

The following candidates were elected:
Arthur Arntzen (Ap); Anton Berge (Ap); Wilhelm Engel Bredal (H-Bp-V); Sverre Gjørwad (H-Bp-V); Klara Amalie Skoglund (Ap); and Asbjørn Solberg (KrF).

1945
Results of the 1945 parliamentary election held on 8 October 1945:

As the list alliance was not entitled to more seats contesting as an alliance than it was contesting as individual parties, the distribution of seats was as party votes.

The following candidates were elected:
Arthur Arntzen (Ap); Wilhelm Engel Bredal (Bp); Leif Grøner (H); Magnus Johansen (Ap); Klara Amalie Skoglund (Ap); and Asbjørn Solberg (KrF).

1930s

1936
Results of the 1936 parliamentary election held on 19 October 1936:

As the list alliance was entitled to more seats contesting as an alliance than it was contesting as individual parties, the distribution of seats was as list alliance votes. The H-Bp-V list alliance's additional seat was allocated to the Conservative Party.

The following candidates were elected:
Magnus Johansen (Ap); Andreas Maastad (Bp); Anton Julius Mosbæk (Ap); John August Solberg (H); Peter Olai Thorvik (Ap); and Johan Undrum (H).

1933
Results of the 1933 parliamentary election held on 16 October 1933:

As the list alliance was entitled to more seats contesting as an alliance than it was contesting as individual parties, the distribution of seats was as list alliance votes. The Bp-H list alliance's additional seat was allocated to the Farmers' Party.

The following candidates were elected:
Johannes Olaf Bergersen (Ap); Birger Braadland (Bp); Andreas Maastad (Bp); August Thorvald Svendsen (Ap); Peter Olai Thorvik (Ap); and Johan Undrum (H).

1930
Results of the 1930 parliamentary election held on 20 October 1930:

The following candidates were elected:
Johannes Olaf Bergersen (Ap); Peder Kolstad (Bp); Andreas Maastad (Bp); August Thorvald Svendsen (Ap); Peter Olai Thorvik (Ap); and Johan Undrum (H).

1920s

1927
Results of the 1927 parliamentary election held on 17 October 1927:

The following candidates were elected:
Johannes Olaf Bergersen (Ap); Henrik Christian Henriksen (Ap); Gunder Anton Johannesen Jahren (H-FV); Peder Kolstad (Bp); Andreas Maastad (Bp); and Peter Olai Thorvik (Ap).

1924
Results of the 1924 parliamentary election held on 21 October 1924:

The following candidates were elected:
Johannes Olaf Bergersen (S); Johan Kristian Hansen Ileby (H-FV); Gunder Anton Johannesen Jahren (H-FV); Peder Kolstad (Bp); Andreas Maastad (Bp); and Peter Olai Thorvik (S).

1921
Results of the 1921 parliamentary election held on 24 October 1921:

The following candidates were elected:
Johannes Olaf Bergersen (S); Johan Kristian Hansen Ileby (H-FV); Gunder Anton Johannesen Jahren (H-FV); Peder Kolstad (L); Johan Fredrik Olsen Maseng (V); and Peter Olai Thorvik (S).

Andreas Maastad (Bp);

Notes

References

Storting constituency
Storting constituencies
Storting constituencies established in 1921